Judge Peterson may refer to:

Arthur Frederick Peterson (1859–1922), judge of the English High Court of Justice
Clark A. Peterson (fl. 1990s–2020s), Idaho state magistrate judge in Coeur d'Alene
James D. Peterson (born 1957), judge of the United States District Court for the Western District of Wisconsin
Randolph W. Peterson (born 1953), judge of the Minnesota Court of Appeals
Rosanna M. Peterson (born 1951), judge of the United States District Court for the Eastern District of Washington

See also
Justice Peterson (disambiguation)